Mohammed Amin Doudah (born 10 September 2002) is a Belgian footballer who plays for Jong PSV as a defender.

References

2002 births
Living people
Belgian footballers
PSV Eindhoven players
Jong PSV players
Eerste Divisie players
Association football defenders
Belgian expatriate footballers
Belgian expatriates in the Netherlands
Expatriate footballers in the Netherlands